William Robert Wallace, Jr. (born June 23, 1992), nicknamed Dr. Bo, is an American football coach and former player. He played college football at Ole Miss and was the Rebels starting quarterback from 2012 to 2014.

College career
Wallace attended Arkansas State University in 2010 under head coach Steve Roberts. He was redshirted for his first year. In 2011, he transferred to East Mississippi Community College, where he passed for 4,604 yards and 53 touchdowns, setting NJCAA records for passing touchdowns and total offense. In 2012, he transferred to the University of Mississippi to play under head coach Hugh Freeze. On August 30, he was named the Rebels starting quarterback. On November 27, he was awarded the Conerly Trophy, which is given to the best college football player in the state of Mississippi. On January 5, 2013, he was named the BBVA Compass Bowl MVP. On December 30, 2013, he was named the Music City Bowl MVP.

Statistics

Professional career 

Wallace went undrafted in the 2015 NFL Draft. Wallace was invited to the Kansas City Chiefs rookie minicamp on a tryout basis. He was not signed to a contract at the conclusion of the rookie minicamp.

Post-playing career 
In February 2016, Marshall County, out of Tennessee, announced that Wallace would be the quarterback coach at Marshall County High School, where his younger brother was the high school quarterback, to help coach the football team.

In January 2017, East Mississippi Community College announced that Wallace was hired to be the team's quarterback coach. Wallace won a national championship at EMCC in 2011 and won NJCAA player of the year. 

On December 9, 2020, Pearl River Community College announced that Wallace had been hired as the co-offensive coordinator and quarterbacks coach.

On November 16, 2021, Holmes Community College announced that Wallace had been hired as the quarterbacks coach.

References

External links
Ole Miss Rebels bio
East Mississippi Community College Lions bio

1992 births
Living people
American football quarterbacks
Arkansas State Red Wolves football players
East Mississippi Lions football coaches
East Mississippi Lions football players
High school football coaches in Texas
Ole Miss Rebels football players
People from Pulaski, Tennessee
Players of American football from Tennessee
High school football coaches in Tennessee